June Keithley-Castro (March 10, 1947 – November 24, 2013) was a Filipina actress and broadcast journalist.

Early life
Castro was born to a Cebuano mother and an American father. She studied at St. Paul College, where she was mentored by James B. Reuter. She married broadcaster Angelo Castro, Jr. in 1973 and the couple had three children: Diego, an actor and anchor of UNTV, Gabriella, and Angelica.

Acting career
Prior to becoming a journalist, Castro had a television and film career. She was part of the cast in the defunct ABS-CBN comedy-gag show Super Laff-In from 1969 until 1972. She appeared in several films, including Durog (1971), and Lunes, Martes, Miyerkules, Huwebes, Biyernes, Sabado, Linggo (1976).

People Power Revolution

During the People Power Revolution of 1986, Keithley helped comandeer the offices of DZRJ-AM radio station in Manila, where she along with Father James Reuter, set up Radyo Bandido, which served as an alternative source for news of the uprising after the destruction of Radio Veritas' transmitter by government soldiers on 23 February. As government forces failed to discover their whereabouts despite their proximity to Malacanang Palace, Radyo Bandido helped sustain the momentum of the revolt that ultimately toppled the dictatorship of President Ferdinand Marcos on 25 February.

Illness and death
In 2009, Castro was diagnosed with breast cancer and told she had three years to live. She died, aged 66, on November 24, 2013, at St. Luke's Medical Center, Quezon City, Metro Manila.

Presidential spokesperson Edwin Lacierda issued a statement announcing her death on Philippine television.

Affiliations
Castro hosted a religious program called "The Woman Clothed with the Sun".

Awards
During the administration of Corazon Aquino, Castro was conferred the Philippine Legion of Honor, becoming a reservist in the Armed Forces of the Philippines with the rank of general.

In 2013, she and Reuter were given a plaque of recognition and the Spirit of EDSA award during the 27th year commemoration of the EDSA People Power Revolution.

In popular culture
Keithley was portrayed by Odette Khan in the 1988 Australian television film A Dangerous Life, which revolves around the events before and during the People Power Revolution.

References

1947 births
2013 deaths
People from Manila
Filipino film actresses
Filipino people of American descent
Filipino television actresses
Filipino television journalists
Deaths from cancer in the Philippines
Deaths from breast cancer
Roman Catholic activists
Burials at the Loyola Memorial Park
Women television journalists